Gonzalo Sánchez may refer to:

Gonzalo Sánchez of Aragon (died 997?), Navarrese ruler in Aragon
Gonzalo of Sobrarbe and Ribagorza ( 1020 – 1043), Navarrese king of Sobrarbe and Ribagorza
Gonzalo Sánchez (baseball) (born 1883, died ?), Cuban catcher